Myles Madison Jury (born October 31, 1988) is an American mixed martial artist, who competes in the Lightweight division. He has most notably fought for Ultimate Fighting Championship (UFC) and Bellator MMA. He is a Black Belt in Brazilian Jiu-Jitsu.

Background
Jury was born in Hazel Park, Michigan and was raised in a broken home, as his parents divorced when he was two years old causing Jury to live with his father who was a roofer. Jury began wrestling in the seventh grade at Beecher Junior High in Hazel Park, MI and demonstrated his grappling talents early, going 12-2 in his first year. Jury then began training in Brazilian jiu-jitsu at the age of 13, being taken under the wing of Professor Don Richard. From there, Jury transitioned into MMA when he was 14 and had his first fight when he was 15. Jury later moved to nearby Fenton, Michigan with his mother and step-father, a mechanic. Jury attended Fenton High School, where he won the district championship and received All-State honors in his senior year. Jury then attended Oakland Community College, but stopped to focus more on training.

Mixed martial arts career

Early career
Jury made his professional MMA debut in October 2005. Prior to appearing on The Ultimate Fighter, he competed primarily for the King of the Cage promotion in California. In his first five years as a fighter he amassed a record of 9-0, with all of his wins coming in the first round.
Fury earned his black belt in Brazilian jiu-jitsu under Professor Don Richard (who is a black belt under Master Caique). From there he started his own MMA Affiliate system teaching wrestling, striking, and jiu-jitsu for MMA; Jury Jiu Jitsu.

The Ultimate Fighter
Myles Jury had two stints on the Ultimate Fighter. His first stint was on TUF 13, when he tore his ACL in the first episode and was sidelined for a year without being able to train. But he was able to compete on TUF 15 as was one of the 32 Lightweight fighters announced by the UFC to participate in the first live season of The Ultimate Fighter reality show.

Jury won his fight to get in the house, then was selected to fight Al Iaquinta and was defeated by split decision after three rounds, which won fight of the season.

Ultimate Fighting Championship
Jury officially made his UFC debut at The Ultimate Fighter 15 Finale on June 1, 2012 against Chris Saunders. He won the fight via submission in the first round.

Jury next fought Michael Johnson on December 29, 2012 at UFC 155. Jury dominated Johnson for all three rounds to earn a unanimous decision.

Jury faced Ramsey Nijem on April 20, 2013 at UFC on Fox 7. He won the fight via one punch knockout in the second round.

Jury faced Mike Ricci on September 21, 2013 at UFC 165. Jury won the fight via split decision.

For his fifth UFC fight, Jury faced Diego Sanchez on March 15, 2014 at UFC 171. He won the fight via unanimous decision.

Jury was expected to face Abel Trujillo on June 28, 2014 at UFC Fight Night 44.  However, Jury pulled out of the bout citing an injury and Trujillo was pulled for the event as well.

Jury next faced Takanori Gomi on September 20, 2014 at UFC Fight Night 52. He won the fight via TKO in the first round.

Jury faced Donald Cerrone on January 3, 2015 at UFC 182. He lost the one sided fight via unanimous decision.

Jury was expected to face Anthony Pettis on July 25, 2015 at UFC on Fox 16.  However, Pettis pulled out of the bout on May 8 and was replaced by Edson Barboza. Subsequently, Jury pulled out of the fight citing injury and was replaced by Paul Felder.

For his next bout, Jury moved to the featherweight division to face Charles Oliveira on December 19, 2015 at UFC on Fox 17.  In the lead up to the fight Oliveira missed weight for the bout and it was subsequently contested at a catchweight.  Oliveira won the fight via submission in the first round.

Jury faced Mike De La Torre on April 8, 2017 at UFC 210. He won the fight via TKO in the first round.

Jury faced Ricky Glenn on December 30, 2017 at UFC 219. He won the fight by unanimous decision.

Jury faced Chad Mendes on July 14, 2018 at UFC Fight Night 133. He lost the fight via TKO in the first round.

Jury faced Andre Fili on February 17, 2019 at UFC on ESPN 1. He lost the fight by unanimous decision.

Bellator MMA
On July 18, 2019, it was announced that Jury had signed a four-fight deal with Bellator MMA. Jury made his promotional debut against Benson Henderson in Jury's return to Lightweight at Bellator 227 on September 27, 2019. He lost the fight by unanimous decision.

Jury faced Brandon Girtz on February 21, 2020 at Bellator 239. He won the fight by unanimous decision.

Jury faced Georgi Karakhanyan on August 7, 2020 at Bellator 243. He won the fight via split decision.

Jury faced Sidney Outlaw at Bellator 261 on June 25, 2021. After being dominated by Outlaw on the ground, Jury lost the bout rear-naked choke in the third round.

Personal life
Jury is known for investing in real estate, and runs a YouTube channel where he talks about his experiences in MMA and investing. He has provided detailed breakdowns of the finances of UFC fighters, including their revenue streams (direct pay, win bonus, locker room bonus) and sponsorships.

Mixed martial arts record

|-
|Loss
|align=center|19–6
|Sidney Outlaw
|Submission (rear-naked choke)
|Bellator 261 
|
|align=center|3
|align=center|4:44
|Uncasville, Connecticut, United States 
|
|-
|Win
|align=center|19–5
|Georgi Karakhanyan
|Decision (split)
|Bellator 243 
|
|align=center|3
|align=center|5:00
|Uncasville, Connecticut
|
|-
|Win
|align=center|18–5
|Brandon Girtz
|Decision (unanimous)
|Bellator 239 
|
|align=center|3
|align=center|5:00
|Thackerville, Oklahoma
|
|-
|Loss
|align=center|17–5
|Benson Henderson
|Decision (unanimous)
|Bellator 227 
|
|align=center|3
|align=center|5:00
|Dublin, Ireland
|
|-
|Loss
|align=center|17–4
|Andre Fili
|Decision (unanimous)
|UFC on ESPN: Ngannou vs. Velasquez 
|
|align=center|3
|align=center|5:00
|Phoenix, Arizona, United States
|
|- 
|Loss
|align=center|17–3
|Chad Mendes
|TKO (punches)
|UFC Fight Night: dos Santos vs. Ivanov 
|
|align=center|1
|align=center|2:52
|Boise, Idaho, United States
|
|-
|Win
|align=center|17–2
|Ricky Glenn
|Decision (unanimous)
|UFC 219
|
|align=center|3
|align=center|5:00
|Las Vegas, Nevada, United States
|
|-
|Win
|align=center|16–2
|Mike De La Torre
|TKO (elbows and punches)
|UFC 210
|
|align=center|1
|align=center|3:30
|Buffalo, New York, United States
|
|-
| Loss
| align=center| 15–2
| Charles Oliveira
| Submission (guillotine choke)
| UFC on Fox: dos Anjos vs. Cowboy 2 
| 
| align=center| 1
| align=center| 3:05
| Orlando, Florida, United States
| 
|-
| Loss
| align=center| 15–1
| Donald Cerrone
| Decision (unanimous)
| UFC 182
| 
| align=center| 3
| align=center| 5:00
| Las Vegas, Nevada, United States
|
|-
| Win
| align=center| 15–0
| Takanori Gomi
| TKO (punches)
| UFC Fight Night: Hunt vs. Nelson
| 
| align=center| 1
| align=center| 1:32
| Saitama, Japan
| 
|-
| Win
| align=center| 14–0
| Diego Sanchez
| Decision (unanimous)
| UFC 171
| 
| align=center| 3
| align=center| 5:00
| Dallas, Texas, United States
| 
|-
| Win
| align=center| 13–0
| Mike Ricci
| Decision (split)
| UFC 165
| 
| align=center| 3
| align=center| 5:00
| Toronto, Ontario, Canada
| 
|-
| Win
| align=center| 12–0
| Ramsey Nijem
| KO (punch)
| UFC on Fox: Henderson vs. Melendez
| 
| align=center| 2
| align=center| 1:02
| San Jose, California, United States
| 
|-
| Win
| align=center| 11–0
| Michael Johnson
| Decision (unanimous)
| UFC 155
| 
| align=center| 3
| align=center| 5:00
| Las Vegas, Nevada, United States
| 
|-
| Win
| align=center| 10–0
| Chris Saunders
| Submission (guillotine choke)
| The Ultimate Fighter: Live Finale
| 
| align=center| 1
| align=center| 4:03
| Las Vegas, Nevada, United States
| 
|-
| Win
| align=center| 9–0
| Sam Oropeza
| Submission (standing rear-naked choke)
| KOTC: No Mercy
| 
| align=center| 1
| align=center| 2:55
| Mashantucket, Connecticut, United States
| 
|-
| Win
| align=center| 8–0
| David Herlein
| TKO (punches)
| XCC: Rumble in Royal Oak 5
| 
| align=center| 1
| align=center| 0:48
| Royal Oak, Michigan, United States
| 
|-
| Win
| align=center| 7–0
| Garrett Olson
| Submission (armbar)
| KOTC: Strike Point
| 
| align=center| 1
| align=center| 1:09
| Lac du Flambeau, Wisconsin, United States
| 
|-
| Win
| align=center| 6–0
| Tyrone Holmes
| TKO (punches)
| KOTC: Encore
| 
| align=center| 1
| align=center| 2:20
| Mount Pleasant, Michigan, United States
| 
|-
| Win
| align=center| 5–0
| Karl Kelly
| Submission (punches)
| KOTC: Insanity
| 
| align=center| 1
| align=center| 0:20
| Lac du Flambeau, Wisconsin, United States
| 
|-
| Win
| align=center| 4–0
| Marcus Ajian
| Submission (punches)
| KOTC: Anticipation
| 
| align=center| 1
| align=center| 0:49
| Mount Pleasant, Michigan, United States
| 
|-
| Win
| align=center| 3–0
| Darrell Mitchell
| TKO (elbows)
| KOTC: Level One
| 
| align=center| 1
| align=center| 0:57
| Lac du Flambeau, Wisconsin, United States
| 
|-
| Win
| align=center| 2–0
| Joshua Taibl
| TKO (punches)
| KOTC: Settlement
| 
| align=center| 1
| align=center| 1:20
| Mount Pleasant, Michigan, United States
| 
|-
| Win
| align=center| 1–0
| Brad Johnson
| KO (head kick)
| MFL: Michigan Fight League
| 
| align=center| 1
| align=center| 0:12
| Mishawaka, Indiana, United States
|

Mixed martial arts exhibition record

|-
| Loss
| align=center| 1–1
| Al Iaquinta
| Decision (split)
|rowspan=2| The Ultimate Fighter: Live
|  (airdate)
| align=center| 3
| align=center| 5:00
|rowspan=2|Las Vegas, Nevada, United States
| 
|-
| Win
| align=center| 1–0
|Akbarh Arreola
| Decision (unanimous) 
|  (airdate)
| align=center| 1
| align=center| 5:00
|

Mixed martial arts amateur record

|-
| Win
| align=center| 6-0
| Joel Roberts
| KO (punches)
| KOTC: Bad Boys
| 
| align=center| 1
| align=center| 1:35
| Mount Pleasant, Michigan, United States
| 
|-
| Win
| align=center| 5-0
| Paul Robert Martin
| KO (punch)
| KOTC: Explosion
| 
| align=center| 1
| align=center| 0:31
| Mount Pleasant, Michigan, United States
| 
|-
| Win
| align=center| 4-0
| Scott Bickerstaff
| TKO (punches)
| KOTC: Mass Destruction
| 
| align=center| 1
| align=center| N/A
| Mount Pleasant, Michigan, United States
| 
|-
| Win
| align=center| 3-0
| Mikey Bennett
| Submission (rear-naked choke)
| KOTC: Meltdown
| 
| align=center| 1
| align=center| 1:45
| Indianapolis, Indiana, United States
| 
|-
| Win
| align=center| 2-0
| Dan Loman
| Submission (rear-naked choke)
| Shooto: Battle of the Belts
| 
| align=center| 2
| align=center| 3:34
| St. Louis, Missouri, United States
| 
|-
| Win
| align=center| 1-0
| Adam Mohr
| Submission (guillotine choke)
| Shooto: Battle at the Ballpark 2
| 
| align=center| 1
| align=center| 1:17
| St. Louis, Missouri, United States
|

See also
 List of male mixed martial artists

References

External links
 
 

1988 births
Living people
American male mixed martial artists
Lightweight mixed martial artists
Mixed martial artists utilizing wrestling
Mixed martial artists utilizing Brazilian jiu-jitsu
American practitioners of Brazilian jiu-jitsu
People awarded a black belt in Brazilian jiu-jitsu
Ultimate Fighting Championship male fighters
Bellator male fighters
Mixed martial artists from Michigan
Sportspeople from Metro Detroit
People from Hazel Park, Michigan
People from Fenton, Michigan